Tongling (formerly romanized as Tunglinghsien and Tungkwanshan) is a prefecture-level city in southern Anhui province. A river port along the Yangtze River, Tongling borders Wuhu to the east, Chizhou to the southwest and Anqing to the west.

As of the 2020 census, its population was 1,311,726 inhabitants whom 842,675 lived in the built-up (or metro) area made of 3 urban districts.
The asteroid 12418 Tongling was named after the city.

Geography
It borders Fanchang County to the southeast, Qingyang County and Nanling County to the south, Guichi District of Chizhou to the southwest, and, northwest across the Yangtze, Wuwei County and Zongyang County.

Climate

Administration
The prefecture-level city of Tongling administers 4 county-level divisions, including 3 districts and 1 county.

Tongguan District
Jiao District
Yi'an District
Zongyang County

In 2012, the provincial government made plans to cede Zongyang County from Anqing City to Tongling City, in order to grant the latter land across the Yangtze.

Defunct divisions
Tongguanshan District
Shizishan District

History
Tongling has been famous as a beautiful mountain city since its origins in the Han dynasty over 1500 years ago. Owing to its copper and tin deposits, it was an important center in the past for bronze production. The scale of industrial activity gradually increased through the Ming (1368–1644) and Qing (1644–1911) dynasties, the Japanese occupation of 1938–45, and especially under the Communist government since 1949.

Economy

Today the city's industrial base still revolves around the several nearby copper mines and copper processing operations. The local mineral resources also include : iron, coal, gold, silver, tin, 	Iron sulfide, plus more than twenty other rare minerals associated with them such as nickel, cadmium, gallium, molybdenum, germanium and selenium. Other important industries include chemical works, textiles, building materials, electronics, machinery and food processing. Long a hub of water transportation, in 1995 Tongling became the site of Anhui Province's first highway bridge spanning the Yangtze River.

Although Tongling City is mostly mountainous, the surrounding flatlands are rich agricultural regions producing rice, wheat, cotton, beans, garlic, herbal medicines and ginger. Large amounts of fish are also harvested in the region.

Tongling is the center for conservation efforts to preserve the last remaining Yangtze freshwater dolphins. Two semi-natural reserves have been established in the Tongling area, in the Tongling and Shishou oxbow lakes, but as yet no dolphins have been successfully captured and moved from the river into the lakes.

Tongling has developed at a rapid speed in the past 5 years, i.e. 2003 to 2007.The average GDP per capita has reached ¥44,870 in 2008 which is the second in Anhui province. And the increasing rate is 13%, far more than the average increasing rate of the whole province which is 12.8%.And it aims to achieve $10000 GDP per capita in 2012.

As of 2016, Tongling City, administered 3 districts and 1 county, the total population of 1.7185 million people. GDP of 95.73 billion yuan. By industry, the added value of the primary industry was 4.89 billion yuan, the added value of the secondary industry was 56.96 billion yuan, and the added value of the tertiary industry was 33.87 billion yuan. The three industrial structures are 5.1: 59.5: 35.4. According to the resident population, the annual per capita GDP is 59,960 yuan.

Transport
As of November 2017, Tongling has two bridges across the Yangtze River.

Rail

Tongling is served by the Nanjing–Tongling, Tongling–Jiujiang, Lujiang-Tongling Railways, Nanjing–Anqing Intercity Railway and Hefei-Fuzhou High-Speed Railway.

Culture

The famous poet of Tang Dynasty, Li Bai (c.700–762, also known as Li Po) praised the beauty and richness of Tongling. The Tongling Sports Centre Stadium is located in the city. The football stadium has a capacity of 30,000 and it opened in 2018.

Local specialties

Tongling ginger 
Tongling ginger is one of the "eight treasures" of Tongling. It is a perennial herb and an annual cultivated crop. Tongling ginger is scientifically identified by the Anhui Academy of Agricultural Sciences Horticulture and belongs to the type of white ginger. The fresh ginger skin is white and slightly yellow, the ginger is bergamot-shaped, and the petals are thick and thick.

Tongling dried tofu 
Tongling dried tofu which began production in the Ming Dynasty and has a history of more than 400 years. Because Datong Town is the only way to the Buddhist shrine Jiuhua Mountain, pilgrims worshipping Buddhas from all over the country and Korea, India and other countries must purchase Tongling dried tofu for vegetarian food.

International relations

The contract of town-twinning with the city of Marbach am Neckar in Baden-Württemberg, Germany was established in 1990 and was among the first Sino-German town-twinnings, or sister city relationships. One lady citizen of Marbach am Neckar has been awarded honorary citizenship of Tongling City in 2005, recognizing her relentless effort to keep up the town-twinning. Marbach is the birthplace of the famous German poet Friedrich Schiller (1759–1805), as a symbol of friendship a statue was erected in local Tianjinhu-Lake-Park.

Tongling has been twinned with the Borough of Halton in England since 1997. A Chinese friendship garden was created in the grounds of Runcorn Town Hall in 2006, including a bronze statue gifted by the twin city of Tongling.

References

External links
Government website of Tongling (in Simplified Chinese)

 
Cities in Anhui
Populated places on the Yangtze River